Gopal Parmar is an Indian politician and member of the Bharatiya Janata Party. Parmar was a member of the Madhya Pradesh Legislative Assembly from the Agar constituency in Agar Malwa district for two terms. He fought and won the 1993 election and the 2014 by-election for the Agar seat.

References 

People from Agar Malwa district
Bharatiya Janata Party politicians from Madhya Pradesh
Madhya Pradesh MLAs 1993–1998
Living people
21st-century Indian politicians
Year of birth missing (living people)
Madhya Pradesh MLAs 2013–2018